Jean (or Jacob) Auguste Andrade (12 August 1793 – 11 January 1843) was a French singer and composer.

Biography 
Born in Saint-Esprit (Pyrénées-Atlantiques), son of Rabbi Abraham Andrade, a student of Pierre-Jean Garat and Antoine Ponchard at the Conservatoire de Paris, in 1820 he won First Prize in singing. Professor of vocal music, singer (tenor) of the Orchestre de la Société des concerts du Conservatoire, we owe him romances and nocturnes published at Petibon et Schlesinger.

Andrade died in Paris on 11 January 1843.

Works 
Among his numerous compositions:
Singer
 Messes en mi bémol majeur, 4-part choir and orchestra, 1816.
 Adjutor in oportunitatibus in F major, 4-part choir and orchestra, 1818.

Composer
 Le Départ du matelot, ballade, lyrics by Casimir Delavigne, 1827.
 Le Berger d'Appenzel, singing, piano, c. 1830.
 L'Exilé, singing, piano, c. 1830.
 La promenade sur l'eau, two-voice barcarolla, lyrics by Ulric Guttinguer, 1830.
 La Magicienne, singing, piano, 1835.
 Pleure petite fille, singing, piano, 1835.
 Un ciel étranger, singing, piano, 1835.
 C'est bien la peine d'être sage, ditty, undated.

Publications
 Une leçon de vocalise, with Antoine Romagnesi, 1825.
 Méthode de chant et de vocalisation, undated.

Bibliography 
 Charles Gabet, Dictionnaire des artistes de l’école française au XIXe siècle, 1834, .
 François-Joseph Fétis, Biographie universelle des musiciens, 1860, .
 Paul Vandevijvere, Dictionnaire des compositeurs francs-maçons, 2015 (Read online).

References

External links 
 Andrade, Jacob Auguste on composer–classical–composers

1793 births
1843 deaths
People from Bayonne
French operatic tenors
19th-century French composers
French male composers
Conservatoire de Paris alumni
19th-century French male opera singers